Tall Tales & Legends (also known as Shelley Duvall's Tall Tales & Legends) is an American folklore anthology television series of 9 episodes created by television and film actress Shelley Duvall, who also served as Executive Producer and Presenter, alongside Fred Fuchs, following her success with her first anthology series, Faerie Tale Theatre.

Adapting various American-based folk tales and stories of bravery, the series ran from 1985–1987 on Showtime, as well as The Disney Channel. The series was nominated for a Primetime Emmy Award. It was succeeded by a four-part anthology series, titled Nightmare Classics.

Episodes

Home media
Several episodes were issued on VHS by CBS/Fox Video in the 1980s. Lyrick Studios made it a nine video series on VHS in 1998. Koch Entertainment issued the entire series on DVD in 2005. The episodes were available as separate DVDs or together as a nine-disc box set. The complete series was issued again, this time in a three-DVD set, by E1 Entertainment in 2009.

References

External links

1985 American television series debuts
1987 American television series endings
1980s American children's television series
1980s American anthology television series
1980s American drama television series
American folklore films and television series
English-language television shows
Showtime (TV network) original programming
Disney Channel original programming
The Legend of Sleepy Hollow
Cultural depictions of Davy Crockett
Cultural depictions of Annie Oakley